(25 January 1908 – 13 September 1993), aka Kō Sasaki, was a Japanese film director. He directed films from the 1920s to the 1960s.

Filmography

Director 
He directed 182 films:
  (1945)
 (踊る龍宮城 Odoru ryū kyūjō, literally "Dancing Dragon Palace") (1949)
 The Idle Vassal: House of the Snake Princess (旗本退屈男　謎の蛇姫屋敷 Hatamoto Taikutsuatoko: Nazo no Hebihime-Yoshiki) (1957)
 Shinsengum: Last Days of the Shogunate

Second unit director

References

External links 
 https://www.imdb.com/name/nm0765832/

Japanese film directors
Samurai film directors
1908 births
1993 deaths
Hosei University alumni